Grozăvești may refer to several places in Bucharest:

 Grozăvești, Bucharest, a district
 Grozăvești, a village in Corbii Mari Commune, Dâmbovița County
 Grozăvești, a village in Nicorești Commune, Galați County
 Grozăvești, a village in Hangu, Neamț Commune, Neamț County
 Grozăvești, a village in Drăghiceni Commune, Olt County
 Grozăvești Power Station, a large thermal power plant, having 2 generation groups of 50 MW each having a total electricity generation capacity of 100 MW
 Grozăvești metro station, a metro station

See also 
 Groza (surname)
 Grozești (disambiguation)